

History 

ADR came into existence in 1999 when a group of Professors from the Indian Institute of Management (IIM) Ahmedabad and Bangalore filed a Public Interest Litigation (PIL) with the Delhi High Court regarding the disclosure of the criminal, financial and educational background of the candidates contesting elections. 
The PIL was upheld by the Delhi High Court in 2000, but the Government of India appealed to the Supreme Court of India against the High Court judgement. However, in 2002 and subsequently in 2003, the Supreme Court made it mandatory for all the candidates contesting elections to disclose their criminal, financial and educational background prior to the polls by filing an affidavit with the Election Commission of India.
The process led to greater awareness among voters of criminal cases against politicians.

Founders 
ADR was co-founded by Trilochan Sastry, Jagdeep S. Chhokar, Ajit Ranade, Sunil Handa, Devanath Tirupati, Brij Kothari, Rajesh Agarwal, Pankaj Chandra, Sudarshan Khanna, Prem Pangotra and P.R. Shukla.  headed by Maj. Gen. Anil Verma (Retd.).

Objective 

The objective of ADR is to improve governance and strengthen democracy by continuous work in the area of Electoral and Political Reforms. The ambit and scope of work in this field is enormous, hence, ADR has chosen to concentrate its efforts in the following areas pertaining to the political system of the country:

 Corruption and Criminalization in the Political Process
 Empowerment of the electorate through greater dissemination of information relating to the candidates and the parties, for a better and informed choice
 Need for greater accountability of Indian Political Parties
 Need for inner-party democracy and transparency in party-functioning

Function & Research Areas 

Election Watch or Analysis of Affidavits: Election Watch is the flagship programme of ADR. Since 2002, National Election Watch (NEW) and ADR have been conducting Election Watches across the country. As part of this programme, affidavits of candidates contesting elections are minutely examined and citizens are provided with the information about their background details to help them make an informed choice.
The Election Watch has so far collated data of about 1,82,108 candidates which can be accessed easily on www.myneta.info.
Election Expenses of MPs and MLAs: ADR also analyses the election expenses declared by elected representatives and the data is released to the media/citizens.
Register of Members’ Interest of Rajya Sabha: ADR also analyses Register of Members’ interest of the Rajya Sabha, which was brought into public domain in June 2011 after ADR’s two-year-long RTI battle. The report contains information regarding remunerative directorship, shareholding of controlling nature, regular remunerative activity, paid consultancy and professional engagement of the Rajya Sabha members.

Political Party Watch (PPW): 
ADR’s PPW program is aimed at bringing more transparency and accountability in the functioning of political parties. In 2008, based on an appeal filed by ADR, the Central Information Commission (CIC) declared that the Income Tax Returns of political parties should be made available in the public domain by the IT Department. Since then, ADR has analysed the IT returns of all National and Regional parties of India whose ITR details are available in public domain, from FY 2002-03 till date. An analysis of their Income Tax returns and donations statements filed with the Election Commission of India (ECI) shows that the sources remain largely unknown. ADR analyses the sources of funding of National and Regional political parties. Between FY 2004-05 and FY 2014-15, ADR analysed sources of funding of 6 National and 51 Regional political parties.

 Contribution Reports of Political Parties: Under this program, the contributions reports of political parties containing information about receipt of donations by corporate houses and individuals above Rs 20,000, are analyzed.
 Contribution Reports of Electoral Trusts:  Apart from individuals and companies, there are electoral trusts which contribute the most to National parties and a few Regional parties. The details of contributions received by the Electoral Trusts and the details of donations given by the Trust to political parties are analyzed for the period between FY 2013-14 to FY 2017-18.
 Election Expenditure of Political Parties: ADR, through this program, analyses the details of expenditure declared by various political parties after Lok Sabha and Assembly Elections. Till date, expenditure reports for 91 Assembly Elections and 3 Lok Sabha Elections have been analyzed.

Legal Advocacy: ADR also resorts to legal advocacy for Political and Electoral Reforms. Time to time ADR takes up various issues in the light of good governance by filing relevant complaints/appeals and PILs/writs with Central Information Commission, Supreme Court/ High Court as well as other Central and State agencies. ADR also attends various consultations/round-tables with bodies like Law Commission of India, Election Commission of India, Lok Sabha and Rajya Sabha Secretariat.

ADR Youth Outreach Programmes 
1. Hum Badlenge Apna Bharat

The programme aims to educate senior school children of the challenges faced by Indian Democracy today via workshops. The workshop trainers use videos, audios, quiz papers and other interactive materials to engage with the youth.

2. ADR Campus Ambassadors

The programme aims to engage with college youth in issues related to Indian democracy and involve them proactively in organizing events. The selected Campus Ambassadors are apprised about the issues ADR is working on and their roles and responsibilities as ADR campus representative. All the activities are approved, sponsored, assisted & supervised by the ADR Team.

Achievements 

 May 2002 and March 2003: ADR's petitions resulted in a landmark judgment by the Supreme Court of India by making it mandatory for the  candidates contesting elections to Parliament and State Assemblies to file self sworn affidavits (Form 26) declaring full information regarding their criminal, financial and educational background. In keeping with the spirit of the judgement, at the All India State Election Commissioners' (SEC) Conference held in July 2003, all the State Election Commissions had unanimously resolved to implement the disclosure rules in local body elections.  
 April 2008: ADR obtained a landmark ruling from the Central Information Commission (CIC) stating that Income Tax Returns of Political Parties would now be available in the public domain along with the assessment orders.
 June 2011: After a two year long RTI battle, crucial information on the 'Registers of Members' Interest' was finally mandated by CIC to be available in the public domain in June 2011. The Second report of the ‘Committee on Ethics’ of the Lok Sabha mentions ADR’s recommendations to instate a Register of Members’ Interest to disclose business and financial interests of the members on the same lines as that of the Rajya Sabha. 
 June 2013: The Central Information Commission (CIC) in an effort towards making political parties transparent as well as accountable in their functioning, declared the six national parties BJP, INC, BSP, CPI, CPI(M) and NCP as public authorities . All the six parties refused to comply with CIC's order.  In 2015, a petition was filed by ADR in the Supreme Court to implement CIC's order by bringing them under the preview of  Right to Information Act, 2005.
 July 2013: Supreme Court delivered a Judgment on a petition filed by Lily Thomas and Lok Prahari NGO, (ADR Intervened) setting aside clause 8(4) of the Representation of the People Act. As a result of which sitting MPs and MLAs were barred from holding office on being Convicted in a Court of Law.
 September 2013: ADR had also intervened in the petition filed by Common Cause for having a separate button on the Electronic Voting Machine (EVM) with the option of ‘None of the Above (NOTA).’  The Supreme Court gave a favourable ruling on 27 September 2013 and the NOTA button was inserted in the EVM machines for the Lok Sabha elections in 2014.
 May 2014: The Delhi High Court issued notices to the Government of India and the Election Commission on a petition filed by ADR to monitor election expenditure of political parties.
August 2016: Prof. Trilochan Sastry, Chairman ADR, represented ADR at the 3rd Asian Electoral Stakeholder Forum (AESF III) conference in Bali, Indonesia.
February 2018: On a petition of Lok Prahari regarding disproportionate asset increase of the MPs & MLAs, Supreme Court made it mandatory for candidates to declare sources of income of spouse & dependents in Form 26 of affidavits. ADR had intervened in the matter & also provided all the necessary data.

ADR Reports 

ADR has become the single data point for information/analysis of background details (criminal, financial and others) of politicians and of financial information of political parties. In the last few years, based on ADR’s report and data, a huge number of coverage was received in print and online media.

In November 2021, ADR said in its report that over 55% of the donations received by regional parties in the financial year 2019-20 came from “unknown” sources and electoral bonds accounted for nearly 95% of the donations from “unknown” sources.

In January 2022, ADR report revealed that the Bharatiya Janata Party (BJP) with assets of ₹4,847.78 crore (US$608.6 million) in the fiscal year 2019-20 was the richest among all political parties. BJP is followed by the Bahujan Samaj Party (BSP) with assets of ₹698.33 crore (US$87.6 million) and Congress with ₹588.16 crore (US$73.8 million). Thus, BJP owns 70% of the total assets declared by national parties.

In July 2022, ADR reported that about 91% or ₹113.79 crore (US$14.2 million) of the total donations received by regional political parties went to five parties: Janata Dal (United), Dravida Munnetra Kazhagam (DMK), Aam Aadmi Party (AAP), Indian Union Muslim League (IUML) and Telangana Rashtra Samithi (TRS).

Awards

See also 
 Democracy in India
 Election Commission of India
 List of think tanks in India

References 

Non-profit organisations based in India
Think tanks based in India